Sex, Drugs and Rap N' Roll is the fourth release by the trip hop/rap rock group Phunk Junkeez, released on January 23, 2001, on Trauma Records.

Track listing

External links
 http://www.cduniverse.com/productinfo.asp?pid=1575271
 http://www.artistdirect.com/nad/store/artist/album/0,,1098034,00.html

2001 albums
Phunk Junkeez albums